The Fatback Band (later, simply Fatback) is an American funk and disco band that was popular in the 1970s and 1980s. The Fatback Band is most known for their R&B hits, "(Do the) Spanish Hustle", "I Like Girls", "Gotta Get My Hands on Some (Money)", "Backstrokin'" and "I Found Lovin'". Their 1979 single "King Tim III (Personality Jock)" is generally considered the first commercially released hip hop single.

History
Formed in New York City in 1970, the Fatback Band was the concept of Bill Curtis, an experienced session drummer, inspired to merge the "fatback" jazz beat of New Orleans into a funk band. In addition to Curtis, the band's initial line-up included guitarist Johnny King, bassist Johnny Flippin, trumpet player George Williams, saxophonist Earl Shelton, flautist George Adams, and keyboardist Gerry Thomas. The band specialized in playing "street funk". The group also later included conga player Wayne Woolford, vocalists Jayne and Gerry, Deborah Cooper saxophonist Fred Demerey,  guitarist Louis Wright and George Victory.

The Fatback Band signed to Perception Records and had a hit single that summer with "Street Dance". The single reached the top 30 on the US Billboard R&B chart, but failed to cross over to the Pop chart, a pattern the group would follow for the rest of their career. The band released the albums Let's Do It Again, People Music, and Feel My Soul before signing to Event Records in 1974.

In the mid-1970s, the band incorporated jazz elements and moved more towards a disco sound resulting in the singles, "Keep On Steppin'", "Yum, Yum (Give Me Some)", and "(Are You Ready) Do the Bus Stop". The singles proved popular in dance clubs, but did not do as well on the R&B chart until the spring of 1976 when "(Do The) Spanish Hustle" came close to the top ten.

Now recording for Spring/Polydor, the group continued with the singles "Party Time", "The Booty", and "Double Dutch". Late 1977 brought a name change to Fatback, and in 1978 they found their first top ten single with "I Like Girls". The song "King Tim III (Personality Jock)" is often considered to be the first commercially released rap single, having shipped just a week before the Sugarhill Gang's "Rapper's Delight" in October 1979.

In 1980, Fatback had a pair of their biggest hits with "Gotta Get My Hands on Some (Money)" and "Backstrokin'". Also finding the charts in the 1980s were "Take It Any Way You Want It", "I Found Lovin'" and "Spread Love", with singer Evelyn Thomas, in 1985.  Whilst American pop success proved elusive, the group made regular appearances on the UK Singles Chart, including the top ten twice with "(Do The) Spanish Hustle" and "I Found Lovin'"; the latter also covered by British disc jockey Steve Walsh, reached the top ten at the same time as the original version.

Keyboardist Gerry Thomas was simultaneously a member of the Jimmy Castor Bunch, so the band elected to remain close to the New York area instead of extensive touring. They had substantial success in South America, especially in Brazil (with "Money" and "Backstrokin'").
As recent as 2019, the Fatback Band performed at multiple concerts and festivals in London and other cities in England. Their 2020 tour was cancelled due to the COVID-19 pandemic.  They have a new album to be released in 2021 and have performances scheduled in July 2021.

Band members

Current
 Bill "Fatback" Curtis – drums/percussions (1970–present)
 Xavier Zack Guinn – bass Guitar, vocals (2015–present)
 Ledjerick Todd Woods – trumpet (2002–present) 
 Darryl McAllister – guitar, vocals (2005–present)
 Isabella Dunn Gordon – vocals
 Montreal Parker – drums
 Marell Glenn – keyboards (2018–present)

Past
 Billy Hamilton – organ, keyboard (1970–1972)
 Earl Shelton – saxophone (1970–1979)
 Johnny King – guitar, vocals (1970–1979)
 Johnny Flippin – bass, percussion, vocals (1971–1983)
 Gerry Thomas – keyboard (1971–1985)
 George Adams – flute (1972–1974)
 Skip Walker – drums (1985–1988, 2007)
 Tom Browne – trumpet (1976)
 Najee – saxophone (1983)
 John DeBerry – vocals (1985–1988, 1997)
 Wayne Wilford – percussion (1973)
 Fred Demery – saxophone (1977, 1979–1981)
 Louis Wright – guitar (1976–1977)
 George Victory – guitar (1977, 1979–1981, 1983)
 Deborah Cooper – backing vocals (1977–1979)
 Michael Walker – keyboard, vocals (1981, 1983)
 Robert Damper – keyboard (1983–1987)
 Linda Blakely (d.1994) – vocals (1982–1987)
 Vernon Lloyd – bass guitar, vocals (1983–1990)
 Quenetta "Que" Simpson – vocals (1996–2006)
 Ed Jackson – saxophone

Discography

Albums

Singles

References

External links
The Fatback Band Official Site
Bill Curtis Official Site
The Fatback Band / Bill Curtis 2011 Interview at Soulinterviews.com

1970 establishments in New York (state)
American dance music groups
American disco groups
American funk musical groups
Musical groups established in 1970
Musical groups from New York (state)
Atco Records artists